The Hartford & New Haven Railroad Freight Depot is a historic building at 40 Mechanic Street in downtown Windsor, Connecticut, across the street from the equally historic Hartford & New Haven Railroad Depot.  Built about 1870, it is a well-preserved example of a Gothic Revival freight depot.   It was listed on the National Register of Historic Places in 1988.  It is now the home of the Windsor Arts Center, a non-profit place that exhibits the work of visual and performing artists.

Description and history
The former Hartford & New Haven Railroad Freight Depot is located on the east side of Windsor's downtown area, on the west side of Mechanic Street at its junction with Central Street.  It is a long rectangular two-story brick building, set between Mechanic Street and the tracks of the Hartford and New Haven Railroad, now the main line railroad between Hartford, Connecticut and Springfield, Massachusetts.  It is located diagonally opposite the tracks and Center Street from the current Amtrak station.  It has a largely utilitarian design with some Gothic Revival flourishes.  Its roof is topped by square ventilators capped with pyramidal roofs.  The present main entrance, on the short end facing Center Street, is sheltered by a gabled bracketed wood-frame hood.  The long facades are eleven bays long, articulated by brick piers.  Some bays have segmented-arch openings.  The roof has extended eaves with exposed rafter and purlin ends.

The construction date of the building is uncertain.  A small freight depot is documented as standing on this site in 1869, but it is possible that the current building replaced that one around the time that the adjacent passenger depot was built by the Hartford and New Haven Railroad.  Since 2007, the building has housed the Windsor Arts Center.

See also
National Register of Historic Places listings in Windsor, Connecticut

References

Further reading

Windsor, Connecticut
Railway stations on the National Register of Historic Places in Connecticut
Railway freight houses on the National Register of Historic Places
Transportation buildings and structures in Hartford County, Connecticut
Historic American Engineering Record in Connecticut
Railway buildings and structures in Connecticut
National Register of Historic Places in Hartford County, Connecticut
Railway buildings and structures on the National Register of Historic Places in Connecticut
Historic district contributing properties in Connecticut
Former railway stations in Connecticut